Jasvir Singh may refer to:

 Jasvir Singh (kabaddi) (born 1984), Indian kabaddi player
 Jasvir Singh (weightlifter) (born 1977), Canadian weightlifter
 Jasvir Singh (barrister) (born 1980), British family law barrister